Yorick van Wageningen (born 16 April 1964) is a Dutch actor who has performed in Dutch and American films, including The Chronicles of Riddick and the 2011 remake of The Girl with the Dragon Tattoo.

Life and career
Van Wageningen was born in Baarn. After acting in several Dutch plays, movies, and television series, van Wageningen was asked to come to Hollywood to appear in Steven Spielberg's Minority Report. Due to problems with his visa, he was unable to work on that movie, but thereafter acted in a number of American movies, achieving a breakthrough with his role in The Chronicles of Riddick.

Back in the Netherlands, he starred in Winter in Wartime, based on a Dutch novel about World War II.

In 2011, he appeared in The Girl with the Dragon Tattoo along with Daniel Craig, in the role of Nils Bjurman, the sexually abusive guardian of Lisbeth Salander (Rooney Mara). He garnered praise in the Dutch press for his portrayal of Ronnie, an Amsterdam gangster who experiences a spiritual resurrection after miraculously surviving an assassination attempt, in the 2013 film De wederopstanding van een klootzak.

In 2017, Van Wageningen was reported to be filming one of his last major roles, a remake of 1973's Papillon, and in pre-production for Simon de Waal's The Fear of God, before shifting his attention to "improving the position of creators in the Netherlands".

Filmography

Film

Television

Awards and nominations

References

External links

1964 births
Living people
Dutch expatriates in the United States
Dutch male television actors
Dutch male film actors
Dutch male stage actors
People from Baarn
21st-century Dutch male actors
20th-century Dutch male actors